Abu Zafar Obaidullah (1934–2001) was a Bangladeshi poet. Two of his long poems, Aami-Kingbodontir-Kathaa Bolchi and Bristi O Shahosi Purush-er Jonyo Pranthona, have become famous since their first publication in the late 1970s.

Life and career 

On 8 February 1934 poet Abu Zafar Mohammad Obaidullah Khan (A. Z. M. Obaidullah Khan) was born in Baherchar-Kshudrakathi village under Babuganj upazila of Barisal district on 8 February 1934, in undivided India. He was the second son of Justice Abdul Jabbar Khan, a former speaker of the Pakistan national assembly. He received his primary education in Mymensingh town where his father Abdul Jabbar Khan was working as the district judge. In 1948, he passed the matriculation examination from the Mymensingh Zilla School. He passed the Intermediate in Arts examination as a student of the Dhaka College in 1950. He was then admitted into the Dhaka University to study English and after securing B.A. (Honours) and M.A. degrees, he joined the same university in 1954 as a lecturer in the Department of English. He appeared in the Pakistan Superior Service Examinations and having stood second in the combined national merit list, he joined the Civil Service of Pakistan in 1957. He was promoted as Secretary to the Government of Bangladesh in 1976 and after retiring in 1982, he accepted the position of Minister for Agriculture and Water Resources in 1982. Later he also served as Bangladesh's Ambassador to the United States of America. In 1992, he became the Assistant Director General of FAO Regional Office in Bangkok; he retired from this position four years later. He died on 19 March 2001. He was the second eldest brother of journalist Enayetullah Khan and politician Rashed Khan Menon.

Participation in Language Movement 

Abu Zafar Obaidullah actively participated in the Language Movement of 1952. He composed "Kono Ek Ma-key" ("To a Mother") for the first anthology on Ekushey, which is recited at the Central Shaheed Minar on 21 February every year.

Poetry 

Obaidullah was an innovator in terms of both style and subject matter. He frequently wrote about ordinary people and their lives and dreams, as well as Bangladesh's liberation struggle.

Padaboli 

He founded "Padaboli" which became the leading poetry movement of Bangladesh in the 1980s.

Obaidullah Khan was one of the pioneers of the Dhaka-centric group theatre movement that originated in the 1950s. Along with Syed Maksudus Saleheen, Taufiq Aziz Khan and Bazlul Karim he established Drama Circle in 1956.

Awards 

 Ekushey Padak (1985)
 Bangla Academy Literary Award (1979)

Poet Abu Zafar Obaidullah Foundation 

Poetry lovers of Dhaka established Poet Abu Zafar Obaidullah Foundation in 2002. Currently Arif Nazrul is the Foundation president (2008). Among other regular activities, this foundation gives annual awards to people they view as contributing to the national interest.

Also, "Poet Abu Zafar Obaidullah Smriti Pathagar" (memorial library) was established in Babuganj of Barisal in 2003.

Books 

Poet Hasan Hafizur Rahman published Obaidullah's first compilation of poetry at Saogat Press in 1962. In 1999, the complete poems of Abu Zafar Obaidullah, covering all eight of poetry books of the poet, were compiled in a volume titled "Abu Zafar Obaidullah-er Kabitasamagra".

 Kokhono Rong Kokhono Shoor
 Kamol-er Chokh
 Ami Kingbadontir Katha Bolchhi
 Shohishnu Protikkha
 Brishti Ebong Shahoshi Purush-er Jonyo Prarthona
 Amar Shomoi Amar Shakol Katha
 Khachar Bhitor Ochin Pakhi
 Yellow Sands' Hills: China through Chinese Eyes
 Rural Development – Problems and Prospects
 Creative Development; Food and Faith
 Abu Zafar Obaidullah-er Kabitasamagra

References 

Bengali writers
Bengali-language writers
20th-century Bengali poets
20th-century Bangladeshi poets
1934 births
2001 deaths
Recipients of the Ekushey Padak
20th-century Indian poets
Bengali male poets
Bangladeshi male poets
Dhaka College alumni
Mymensingh Zilla School alumni
20th-century Bangladeshi male writers
Recipients of Bangla Academy Award
Road Transport and Bridges ministers of Bangladesh